Bauhinia Sprint Trophy is a Group 3 Thoroughbred horse race in Hong Kong, run at Sha Tin over 1000 metres in December/January. Horses rated 90 and above are qualified to enter the race.
The race held Group One status until 2004 and was won twice, 2004 and 2005, by Silent Witness.

Winners

See also
 List of Hong Kong horse races

References 
Racing Post:
 Racing Information of Bauhinia Sprint Trophy (2011/12)
 The Hong Kong Jockey Club 

Horse races in Hong Kong